Alpenus intactus is a moth of the family Erebidae. It was described by George Hampson in 1916. It is found in northern Nigeria.

References

Moths described in 1916
Spilosomina
Moths of Africa
Insects of West Africa
Insects of Zambia